Mexican pop-rock band Maná has released 9 studio albums, 3 live albums, 7 compilation albums, 5 video albums, 2 box sets and 1 soundtrack album. Throughout their career, Mana has sold over 40 million albums worldwide, becoming the most successful Latin American band of all time. ¿Dónde Jugarán Los Niños? remains as the best-selling Spanish-language rock album in history with 10 million copies sold worldwide. 

In a career spanning 35 years, they have achieved 50 No. 1 hits globally and became the first and only act to sell out 7 dates at the Los Angeles Forum as part of a single tour breaking previous records of 6 shows held by both The Eagles and Kanye West. According to RIAA, they have achieved two Latin-Diamond albums: "¿Dónde Jugarán Los Niños?" and "Sueños Líquidos".

Studio albums

As Sombrero Verde

As Maná

Special edition studio albums

Live albums

Compilations, imports, and greatest hits

Box sets

Remix album

Collaborative album

Singles

As Sombrero Verde singles 

From Sombrero Verde (album) (1981).

"Vampiro" (1981)
"Long Time" (1981)
"Profesor" (1981)
"Despiértate" (1982)
"Concierto" (1982)
 
From A Tiempo de Rock (1983).

"Laura" (1983)
"Hechos Nada Más" (1983)
"Me Voy al Mar" (1984)

As Maná

Duets, collaborations, etc.
1995: "Celoso" (Single) from the My Family soundtrack album.
1999: In December 1998, they were invited by Carlos Santana for a duet single called "Corazón Espinado" for his  Supernatural album. The track was composed by Fher Olvera. This gave them exposure in Europe, Asia, and the Middle East. They also appeared on the Grammy Award presentations and The Tonight Show with Jay Leno.
2001: "Si Ella Me Faltara Alguna Vez" (single) from Pablo Milanés from the Pablo Querido album that features Fher Olvera.
2001: Maná and Enanitos Verdes: Combinaciones Premiadas (album).
2002: "Cartas Marcadas" is a song from Shelia Rios from the Con toda el alma album that features Fher Olvera.
2002: "Mirarte", "Tic tac", and "La noche me gusta" are songs from Miguel Bosé from the Sereno album that features Alex González on drums.
2004: In 2003, Maná teamed up with Italian singer Zucchero, which resulted in two duets: a new version of Maná's "Eres mi Religión" and one of Zucchero's "Baila Morena" (single), both of which were released as singles and the latter of which reached the number one position in the French single charts in 2005. "Baila Morena" (single) from Zucchero is from his  Zu & Co. album.
2004: Belén Arjona asked Maná's vocalist Fher Olvera to perform "Vivir Sin Aire" for a duet for her album called O te mueves o caducas (special edition). It was the fifth and last single of her album.
2004: Maná and La Ley (band): Batalla de las Bandas: Superheros del Rock en Español! (album).
2006: On their seventh album, "Amar es Combatir", features a Bachata song titled "Bendita Tu Luz", a duet along with Dominican Singer Juan Luis Guerra, who is widely regarded throughout Latin-America for his significant contribution to merengue and bachata styles of music.
2007: "No Lo Digo Por Nada" is a song by Alejandro Sanz from his El Tren de los Momentos special edition album which features Alex González on drums.
2011: On their fourth special edition album Drama y Luz deluxe edition features with Latin pop/bachata singer/songwriter Prince Royce for Maná's third single "El Verdadero Amor Perdona" (bachata version)

Videography

Videos 
1998: Maná: Exitos En Video
1999: Maná MTV Unplugged
2002: Suenos Liquidos Videos
2004: Acceso Total
2008: Arde El Cielo

Music videos 
Maná(1987)
1987: "Robot" – director unknown

Falta Amor (1990)
1990: "Rayando el Sol" – director unknown
1990: "Buscándola" – director unknown
1991: "Perdido En Un Barco" – directed by Hector Cardenas

¿Dónde Jugarán los Niños? (1992)
1992: "Oye Mi Amor" – directed by Hugo Massa
1992: "Vivir Sin Aire" – directed by Gustavo Garzon
1993: "Como Te Deseo" – director unknown
1993: "Te Lloré Un Rio" – directed by Gustavo Garzon
1993: "Como Diablos" – director unknown
1994: "Me Vale" – director unknown

Cuando los Ángeles Lloran (1995)
1995: "No Ha Parado De Llover"  — directed by Gustavo Garzon
1995: "Hundido En Un Rincón"  — directed by Juan Carlos Martin
1996: "Déjame Entrar"  — directed by Gustavo Garzon

Sueños Líquidos (1997)
1997: "Clavado En Un Bar"  — directed by Jorge Aguilera
1997: "Hechicera"  — directed by Kiko Guerrero
1998: "Como Dueles En Los Labios"  — directed by Kiko Guerrero
1998: "En El Muelle De San Blás"  — directed by Kiko Guerrero
1998: "Un Lobo Por Tu Amor"  — director unknown

Maná MTV Unplugged (1999)
1999: "Se Me Olvidó Otra Vez"  — directed by Milton Lage
1999: "Te Solte La Rienda"  — directed by Milton Lage
2000: "Cachito"  — directed by Milton Lage

Santana album Supernatural (1999)
1999: "Corazón Espinado" (featuring Maná) — directed by Adolfo Doring

Revolución de Amor (2002)
2002: "Ángel de Amor"  — director unknown
2002: "Eres Mi Religión"  — director unknown
2003: "Mariposa Traicionera"  — directed by Eduardo Flemmer and Pablo Flemmer

Esenciales: Luna, Sol & Eclipse (2003)
2003: "Te Llevare Al Cielo"  — director unknown

Belén Arjona album O te mueves o caducas (special edition) (2004)
2004: "Vivir Sin Aire" (featuring Fher Olvera) — director unknown

Amar es Combatir (2006)
2006: "Labios Compartidos"  — directed by Pablo Croce and Felipe Niño
2006: "Bendita Tu Luz" (featuring Juan Luis Guerra) — directed by Israel Lugo and Gabriel Coss
2007: "Manda Una Señal"  — directed by Wayne Isham
2007: "Ojalá Pudiera Borrarte"  — directed by Joaquín Cambre
2008: "El Rey Tiburón"  — directed by Pablo Croce

Arde El Cielo (2008)
2008: "Si No Te Hubieras Ido"  — directed by Pablo Croce
2008: "Arde el Cielo"  — directed by Dago González and Tim Zimmer

Drama Y Luz (2011)
2011: "Lluvia al Corazón"  — directed by Sam Stephens and Ariel Danziger
2011: "Amor Clandestino"  — directed by Pablo Croce
2011: "El Verdadero Amor Perdona" – directed by Pablo Croce
2011: "El Verdadero Amor Perdona" (featuring Prince Royce) – directed by Pablo Croce
2012: "Mi Reina del Dolor" – directed by Joaquín Cambre

Exiliados en la Bahía (2012)
2012: "Hasta Que Te Conocí"  — directed by Pablo Croce

Notes

References

Maná
Discographies of Mexican artists
Latin pop music discographies
Rock music group discographies